CIKR-FM is a Canadian radio station, broadcasting at 105.7 FM in Kingston, Ontario owned by Rogers Sports & Media. The station broadcasts an active rock format branded as K-Rock 105.7.

History
The station was originally owned by K-Rock 105.7 Inc., consisting of John P. Wright (60%), Douglas Kirk (15%), and Rogers Radio (25%). The same ownership group also launched CKXC-FM in early 2008, and operates WLYK in the nearby American community of Cape Vincent, New York through a local marketing agreement.

On September 21, 2000, the station received approval from the CRTC to operate a new English-language FM radio programming undertaking at Kingston. The station was launched at 4 p.m. on March 19, 2001, by Wright, formerly the general manager of the competing stations CKLC and CFLY. It was the first new radio station to be launched in Kingston since 1953. The first song played on "K-Rock" was "Courage" by The Tragically Hip.

CIKR has significant tuning among fans of rock music in the Watertown, New York market. Rogers is the 3rd rated radio cluster in the Watertown market.

On February 6, 2008, K-Rock purchased the naming rights to the K-Rock Centre for 10 years at $3.3 million.

In late November 2008, Rogers announced it would acquire the remainder of the K-Rock partnership, pending CRTC approval. Its application was approved by the CRTC on May 4, 2009.

On May 31, 2010, former morning show host and program director Glenn "G" Williams died after a 2-year battle with ALS at age 42.

In June 2012, popular radio hosts Humble & Fred joined the station to fill-in as hosts of the morning show for the summer.

In February 2013, long-time K-Rock announcer Big Kris returned to the station to host the morning show with co-host Boomer.

References

External links
 K-Rock 105.7
 
 

Ikr
Ikr
Ikr
Radio stations established in 2001
2001 establishments in Ontario